The following is a timeline of the history of the city of Knoxville, Knox County, Tennessee, USA.

Prior to 19th century

 1786 – White's Fort built.
 1791 
Knoxville founded as the capital of the Southwest Territory, named for Henry Knox
Knoxville Gazette newspaper begins publication.
 1792 – Blount Mansion built.
 1793 – First Presbyterian Church established.
 1794 – Blount College (later the University of Tennessee) established.
 1796 – Knoxville becomes capital of new U.S. state of Tennessee.

19th century
 1806 – Hampden and Sydney School incorporated.
 1815 – City of Knoxville incorporated.
 1816 – Thomas Emmerson becomes mayor.
 1817 – Knoxville Hotel in business.
 1818 – Craighead-Jackson House (residence) built.
 1827 – Knoxville Female Academy established.
 1828 – The Atlas becomes the first steamboat to reach Knoxville, having successfully navigated the lower Tennessee River
 1834 – East Tennessee Historical and Antiquarian Society founded.
 1844 – Tennessee Asylum for the Deaf and Dumb established.
 1845 – Warner Tabernacle AME Zion Church congregation established.
 1849 – Brownlow's Whig newspaper relocates to Knoxville.
 1850
 Old Gray Cemetery established.
 Population: 2,076.
 First Baptist Church built.
 1854 
James C. Luttrell becomes mayor.
Market Square established
 1855
 East Tennessee and Georgia Railroad begins operating.
 William Graham Swan becomes mayor.
 1863
 Siege of Knoxville.
 Battle of Fort Sanders.
 Knoxville National Cemetery established.
 1864 – E.J. Sanford and Company in business.
 1868 – City Hall built on Market Square.
 1869 – Knoxville Industrial Association founded.
 1870
 Ebenezer Mill built (approximate date).
 Population: 8,682.
 1871 – Cowan, McClung and Co. building constructed.
 1872 – Staub's Theatre opens.
 1873 – William Rule becomes mayor.
 1874
 Customs House built.
 Peter Staub becomes mayor.
 1875 – Knoxville College founded.
 1885
 Knoxville Fire Department and Lawson McGhee Library established.
 Knox County Courthouse built.
 1886 – Sentinel newspaper (later the Knoxville News Sentinel) begins publication.
 1887
 Knoxville Negro World newspaper begins publication.
 Chamber of Commerce established.
 1888
 Sterchi Brothers Furniture Company in business.
 Martin Condon becomes mayor.
 1890
 Peter Kern becomes mayor.
 Population: 22,535.
 Electric streetcar begins operating.
 1891 – H. T. Hackney Company in business.
 1892 – St. John's Cathedral rebuilt.
 1896 - Flag of Knoxville, Tennessee is designed
 1897
 "Million Dollar Fire" destroys part of Gay Street.
 Market House rebuilt on Market Square.
 North Knoxville (modern Old North Knoxville) becomes part of city
 1898
 West Knoxville (modern Fort Sanders) becomes part of city.
 Gay Street Bridge constructed.

20th century

 1905
 Knoxville Railway and Light Company established.
 L&N Station (Knoxville) built.
 1909 – Knoxville City Beautiful League organized.
 1910
 First Appalachian Exposition held.
 Population: 36,346.
 1911 – Second Appalachian Exposition held.
 1912 – The city replaces its mayor-alderman form of government with a commission.
 1913 – National Conservation Exposition held.
 1914 – Candoro Marble Works in operation.
 1917 
Park City becomes part of the city.
South Knoxville becomes part of the city.
 1919
Riot of 1919 takes place. 
October: Streetcar strike.
 1920 – Population: 77,818.
 1921 – WNAV radio begins broadcasting.
 1923 – The city replaces its commission with a city manager-council form of government; Louis Brownlow hired as first city manager
 1925 – City government moves to City Hall on Summit Hill Drive.
 1926
 Knoxville News Sentinel in publication.
 Lincoln Park United Methodist Church built.
 1927
 WROL radio begins broadcasting.
 Daylight Building constructed.
 1928
 Tennessee Theatre opens.
 James Alexander Fowler becomes mayor.
 1930
 Andrew Johnson Building constructed.
 Population: 105,802.
 1931 – Henley Street Bridge constructed.
 1932 – Church Street Methodist Episcopal Church built.
 1933 – Tennessee Valley Authority headquartered in Knoxville.
 1934 – United States Post Office and Courthouse built.
 1938 – Park Theatre opens.
 1940 – Population: 111,580.
 1942 – Town of Oak Ridge developed near Knoxville.
 1943 – Oak Ridge National Laboratory established near Knoxville.
 1946 
Cas Walker becomes mayor.
Journalist John Gunther dubs Knoxville the "ugliest city" in America, sparking beautification efforts
 1947 – Office of City Manager merged with Mayor's office
 1950 – Population: 124,769.
 1951 - Municipal Zoo established.
 1952 – George Roby Dempster becomes mayor.
 1953 - WATE-TV and WTVK (television) begin broadcasting.
 1956 - WBIR-TV (television) begins broadcasting.
 1959 – John Duncan, Sr. becomes mayor.
 1960
 Protest by African Americans during the Civil Rights Movement.
 Population: 111,827.
 1962
Fountain City and Bearden become part of the city.
 Highlander Research and Education Center relocates to Knoxville from Monteagle.
 1970 – Population: 174,587.
 1972 – Kyle Testerman becomes mayor.
 1974 – Streaking occurs.
 1976 – Randy Tyree becomes mayor.
 1980 – Population: 175,045.
 1981 – Knoxville Community Food Cooperative organized.
 1982 – 1982 World's Fair held; Sunsphere built.
 1983
 Knoxville Opera Company active.
 Halls Cinema in business.
 1984 – Doyle Park established.
 1985 – Riverview Tower built.
 1987 – Victor Ashe becomes mayor.
 1988
 WCKS radio begins broadcasting.
 Jimmy Duncan Jr. becomes U.S. representative for Tennessee's 2nd congressional district.
 1990 – Population: 165,121.
 1991 – City bicentennial.
 1992 – Petro's Chili & Chips franchise headquartered in Knoxville.
 1994 – Home & Garden Television headquartered in Knoxville.
 1995 - City website online.
 1996
 Knoxville-Oak Ridge Regional Network online.
 Adair Park built.
 1998 - Knoxville Area Chamber Partnership organized.

21st century

 2003 – Bill Haslam becomes mayor.
 2005
 Knoxville Marathon begins.
 Tennessee Archive of Moving Image and Sound and Three Rivers Market food co-op established.
 2010 – Population: 178,874.
 2011 – Daniel Brown becomes mayor, succeeded by Madeline Rogero.

See also
 History of Knoxville, Tennessee
 List of mayors of Knoxville, Tennessee
 National Register of Historic Places listings in Knox County, Tennessee
 Timelines of other cities in Tennessee: Chattanooga, Clarksville, Memphis, Murfreesboro, Nashville

References

Bibliography

Published in the 19th century

Published in the 20th century
 
 
 City of Knoxville, Tennessee and Vicinity (Knoxville: Knoxville Board of Trade, 1906)
 
 Knoxville, Tennessee Directory, 1915 (Knoxville: Knoxville Directory Company, 1915).
 
 
 
 Knoxville City Directory, 1960 (Knoxville: City Directory Company, 1960)
 
 East Tennessee Historical Society, Lucile Deaderick (ed.), Heart of the Valley: A History of Knoxville, Tennessee (Knoxville, Tenn.: East Tennessee Historical Society, 1976)
 
 
  (fulltext)

Published in the 21st century

External links

 Items related to Knoxville, various dates (via Digital Public Library of America).
 

 
Knoxville